José Antonio Aguirre may refer to:
José Antonio Aguirre (politician) (1904–1960), Spanish footballer and Basque politician
José Antonio Aguirre (early Californian) (1799–1860), Spanish-born settler in Alta California
José Antonio Aguirre (boxer) (born 1975), Mexican world champion boxer

See also
José Aguirre (disambiguation)